Olga Yuryevna Mullina (born 1 August 1992) is a Russian pole vaulter. She competed in the women's pole vault at the 2017 World Championships in Athletics.

International competitions

National titles
Russian Athletics Championships
Pole vault: 2018

References

External links

1992 births
Living people
Russian female pole vaulters
Authorised Neutral Athletes at the World Athletics Championships
Place of birth missing (living people)